The Equatorial Guinea Workers' Union (UST) is an unregistered trade union in Equatorial Guinea. The Government has refused to register the UST, and it cannot operate openly in the country.

References

ICFTU - Equatorial Guinea: Annual Survey of Violations of Trade Union Rights

Trade unions in Equatorial Guinea